Heino Lipp (June 21, 1922 – August 28, 2006)  was an Estonian athlete, who was one of the greatest decathlete in the decade of the 1940s,  but he was never able to compete in the Olympic Games, because citizens of the Soviet Union were never allowed to travel outside the Soviet Union dominated Iron Curtain countries. He also competed in the shot put, making 6 European records in the event.

Career
Heino Lipp, born in Erra Parish (now Lüganuse Parish) near Kiviõli, Estonia was one of the great decathletes in history, but all his achievements have been obscured in the era of the Cold War politics. He was an Estonian, whose family were prominent advocates of Estonian sovereignty and brother was deemed a disloyal Estonian nationalist and was eventually murdered in a camp in Siberia. Therefore, Lipp was kept as a political prisoner and was periodically jailed by Soviet authorities. He was also not allowed to travel outside the Soviet Union.

In 1948 Track & Field News ranked him  No. 1 in the T&FN World Rankings in decathlon. Four days after Bob Mathias won the 1948 Olympic decathlon with a total 7,139 points, Lipp, produced a decathlon score considerably higher than that of Mathias, scored 7,584 at a meeting in Tartu, Estonia and month after Olympics scored personal record 7,780 points in Kharkiv.

Lipp's achievement, however, was discounted or disbelieved in the West, because the Iron Curtain policies of Joseph Stalin did not allow foreign observers, so there was no way to verify the results. The West never saw Lipp perform, and neither did Soviet bloc countries other than the USSR. Lipp, for example, was not allowed to travel to Budapest for the World University Games in 1949. Photos of the physically imposing Lipp were done in the style of the superman image of the new Soviet man, a Stakhanovite.

In 1951 the Soviet Union joined the Olympic movement and participated in the 1952 Summer Olympics. Lipp's absence from the games was explained by the Soviet press as being due to “illness”. The real story is that the KGB had vetoed Lipp's participation in the Olympics even though it was short distance away in Helsinki, Finland. Competing in 1952, he probably would not have challenged eventual gold-medal winner Mathias, but a silver medal was well within the range of possibility. (Lipp's training was hampered when his scholarship was revoked in another Estonian repression in 1950, and he had to stalk deer and track small game animals daily to sustain himself.)

Lipp was a Soviet champion 12 times and set 13 national records, and never gave the Soviet regime any cause of concern, yet his “suspect” family made him a “political unreliable” to the authorities.

After Estonia broke from the Soviets in early 1990s Lipp came to United States for a Goodwill Games in Seattle as a guest of the US Chamber of Commerce.

He was out of favour with the authorities and did not get his chance to appear on an international stage until Barcelona when, at the age of 76, he proudly carried the Estonian flag at the opening ceremony of the 1992 Summer Olympics.

T&FN world rankings
Decathlon: 1947 – 2nd, 1948 – 1st, 1949 – 2nd, 1950 – 4th, 1953 – 4th
Shot put: 1947 – 1st, 1948 – 5th, 1949 – 7th, 1950 – 3 rd, 1951 – 3rd, 1952 – 9th, 1953 – 10th
Discus throw: 1947 – 5th, 1948 – 5th,

Records
 European shot put records
16.66 24 May 1947 Tartu
16.72 7 July 1947  Tartu
16.73 3 September 1947  Kharkiv
16.93 6 August 1950  Moscow
16.95 17 June 1951  Põltsamaa
16.98 7 September 1951  Minsk

Estonian decathlon records (points table since 1936)
6631 1946 Tartu (11,2 – 6.23 – 14.72 – 1.65 – 53,3 – 15,6 – 38.90 – 3.10 – 50.06 – 5.04,8 )
7097 1947  Tallinn (11,5 – 6.08 – 15.50 – 1.65 – 51,2 – 15,6 – 45.44 – 3.10 – 52.59 – 4.42,6)
7584 1948  Tartu (11,3 – 6.40 – 16.04 – 1.70 – 51,7 – 15,4 – 46.78 – 3.40 – 59.07 – 4.49,4)
7780 (7072 points table since 1985) 11 September 1948  Kharkiv (11,4 – 6.13 – 16.18 – 1.70 – 50,2 – 15,4 – 47.55 – 3.40 – 61.96 – 4.35,0)

Estonian discus throw records
49.41 5 September 1947 Kharkiv
49.50 31 July 1947  Tartu
52.18 29 August 1948  Moscow

Personal records
 100 m – 11,0s; long jump – 6,53m; shot put – 16.98m; high jump – 1,72m; 400 m – 50,2s; 110 m hurdles – 15,0s; discus throw – 52.18m; pole vault – 3.40m; javelin throw – 61.96m; 1,500 m – 4.33,2; decathlon – 7780p

Awards
1954 USSR Master of Sports
1965 USSR Master of Sports of International Class
1991 Honorary member of Estonian Olympic Committee
1992 Estonian Olympic team flag bearer at the Opening ceremony of the 1992 Summer Olympics in Barcelona
1998 Order of the White Star 3 class
1999 City of Tallinn Medal

References

External links
In Memoriam Heino Lipp: June 21, 1922 – August 28, 2006
Heino Lipp – 75  (et icon)
Track & Field News Rankings

1922 births
2006 deaths
People from Lüganuse Parish
Estonian decathletes
Estonian male shot putters
Estonian male discus throwers
Soviet decathletes
Soviet male shot putters
Soviet male discus throwers
Estonian prisoners and detainees
Prisoners and detainees of the Soviet Union
Recipients of the Order of the White Star, 3rd Class